John F. Duane is a former American politician.

Duane contested the Democratic Party primary for New York's 25th State Assembly district in 1982, and defeated Douglas S. MacKay, before winning the general election against incumbent Douglas W. Prescott. Prescott defeated Duane in the 1984 general elections. He contested the 2010 Democratic primary for the 25th district, but was unable to secure the party's nomination. In April 2012, Duane unsuccessfully sought to represent New York City's 19th City Council district.  In March 2018, Duane began another campaign for the 25th Assembly district's Democratic primary.

References

Democratic Party members of the New York State Assembly
Year of birth missing (living people)
Living people
People from Bayside, Queens
Politicians from Queens, New York
20th-century American politicians
21st-century American politicians